Oh Wonder is the debut studio album by English alt-pop duo Oh Wonder, self-released on 4 September 2015. The album is the accumulation of singles released monthly throughout 2014–2015, in addition to two unreleased songs.

Background 
Starting in September 2014, Anthony West and Josephine Vander Gucht wrote, recorded, and released one song on the first of every month for a year on SoundCloud. They have described the creation and release of their debut album as nontraditional, stating that the album consists of 15 singles and was never conceived as an entire record. The debut album consisted of all 13 songs, as well as 2 additional songs, "Without You" and "Plans". The album was written, produced, and mixed by West and Vander Gucht in their home studio in South-East London in 2014–2015.

The album has sold over 1,000,000 copies worldwide (it was the first-ever album to sell 1 million copies on an independent label) and has amassed in excess of 1.5 billion streams. It has been certified gold in the UK, gold in Canada, and platinum in both Russia and the Philippines.

Critical reception 
Oh Wonder received mixed to positive reviews from critics. Serena Weiss of The Ithacan hailed the album as "simplistically stunning" and "hauntingly beautiful", while praising the chemistry between Gucht and West. Music critic Abby Jefers described the albums creation story as “unique” and the music as “astounding.” Marcus Floyd of Renowned for Sound described the album as "airy" and "refreshing."

Usage in media 
The song "All We Do" is featured in the opening credits of the ITV crime drama Unforgotten, at the end of the "Miss Taken" episode of the CBS drama Elementary, in an episode of ITV's Coronation Street, and in the 2015 MTV American slasher horror series Scream. Scream also featured the song "Shark" in season 1 episode 2, and "Technicolor Beat" in season 1 episode 5. The song "Drive" was used in the pilot episode of the 2015 BBC drama Doctor Foster.  “White Blood" was featured in season 3, episode 2 of The CW drama Reign. The first verse of the song "Landslide" was sampled in rapper Lil Uzi Vert's song "The Way Life Goes" from their album Luv Is Rage 2, as well as retaining some of the original vocals, so Oh Wonder are credited as featured artists on the song.

Track listing

Charts

Certifications

References

2015 debut albums
Oh Wonder albums
Island Records albums
Republic Records albums